Caldicot Castle (or Caldecot Castle, or Caldecott Castle), was built in 1794 at Caldicot, Monmouthshire. The French captured her twice, the second time she engaged her captor in a single ship action. She also survived the perils of the sea in 1803, 1807, and 1819. She was wrecked in October 1828 and was last listed in 1832.

Career
Caldicot Castle appears in the 1794 volume of Lloyd's Register with P. Driscoll, master, and trade Bristol—Quebec.

On 18 March 1795, as Caldecot Castle, Driscol, master, was sailing from Barcelona to Guernsey, a French squadron of six ships-of-the-line, two frigates, and a corvette captured her off Cape St. Vincent. However, on 30 March , of Admiral Colpoy's squadron, recaptured her and took her into Falmouth.

In January 1803 Caldicot Castle was returning to Liverpool from Quebec when she had to put in at Crookhaven. She had lost her mizzen mast and rudder, and sustained other damage.

Captain Richard Sherrat wrote a letter from Barbados on 14 April in which he described the attack. He had sailed Caldicot Castle from Demerara on 27 February and by 8 March was about 200 miles east of Guadeloupe when at 8 pm two privateers, a schooner and a ship, came up and opened fire. After about 15 minutes, the schooner had sustained damages and had sheered off. By 9:20 the ship also sheared off but remained in sight. Next morning at 6am the ship recommenced the engagement. After about 15 minutes Sherrat had to strike. Caldicot Castles rigging had been cut to pieces and he and two other men had been wounded, one mortally. The privateer was Grand Decide, which was armed with twenty 9-pounder and two 12-pounder brass guns, and had a crew of 160 men. 

Caldicott Castle returned to British hands, though how is not clear. Her entry in Lloyd's Register for 1805 is marked "captured", but also shows a change of master.

On 18 November 1817 Lloyd's List reported that Caldicot Castle had arrived at Portsmouth, having sailed from Malta via Gibraltar in company with several other transports until heavy weather had separated them.

On 4 December 1819, Caldicott Castle ran aground and was severely damaged at Sunderland, County Durham.

Fate
It was reported on 20 October 1828 that Caldicot Castle had struck a rock and sunk at Milford but by 15 October had been raised and pulled up on Laurenny Beach. Caldicot Castle was last listed in 1832.

Notes

Citations

References
 

Ships built in Wales
1794 ships
Age of Sail merchant ships
Merchant ships of the United Kingdom
Captured ships
Maritime incidents in 1803
Maritime incidents in 1804
Maritime incidents in 1819
Maritime incidents in October 1828